The 1999 Direct Line International Championships was a tennis tournament played on grass courts at the Eastbourne Tennis Centre in Eastbourne in the United Kingdom that was part of Tier II of the 1999 WTA Tour. The tournament was held from 14 June until 19 June 1999. Natasha Zvereva won the singles title.

Entrants

Seeds

Other entrants
The following players received wildcards into the singles main draw:
  Samantha Smith
  Karen Cross
The following players received wildcards into the doubles main draw:
  Julie Pullin /  Lorna Woodroffe

The following players received entry from the singles qualifying draw:

  Louise Latimer
  Elena Tatarkova
  Mariaan de Swardt
  Anne-Gaëlle Sidot

The following players received entry from the doubles qualifying draw:

  Maja Murić /  Christína Papadáki

Finals

Singles

 Natasha Zvereva defeated  Nathalie Tauziat, 0–6, 7–5, 6–3
 It was Zvereva's only singles title of the year and the fourth of her career.

Doubles

 Martina Hingis /  Anna Kournikova defeated  Jana Novotná /  Natasha Zvereva, 6–4 retired

References

External links
 ITF tournament edition details

Direct Line International Championships
Eastbourne International
1999 in English women's sport
June 1999 sports events in the United Kingdom
1999 in English tennis